MELS can mean:
 Marx Engels Lenin Stalin
 Ministry of Education and Higher Education (Quebec)
 MELS Movement of Botswana